The town of Gatchina serves as the administrative center of the Gatchinsky District in Leningrad Oblast, Russia. Population: 

It was previously known as Khotchino, Gatchina (until February 14, 1923), Trotsk (until August 2, 1929), and Krasnogvardeysk (until January 28, 1944).

Gatchina, the largest town in Leningrad Oblast, is best known as the location of the Great Gatchina Palace, one of the main residences of the Russian Imperial Family during the 18th and 19th centuries. The historic center and Gatchina Palace are part of the UNESCO World Heritage Site's "Historic Centre of Saint Petersburg and Related Groups of Monuments".
Another popular tourist attraction in Gatchina is the  Prioratsky Palace.

Gatchina has placed highly in quality-of-life rankings in Russia.

History

Early history
Gatchina was first documented in 1499 under the name Khotchino as a village in possession of the Novgorod Republic. In the 17th century it was passed to Livonia and then to Sweden in a series of wars, until the early years of the Great Northern War at the turn of the 1700s when the area was returned to Russia. Despite technically still belonging to Swedish Ingria, in 1708, Gatchina was given by Peter the Great to his sister, Natalya Alexeyevna, and after her death in 1716 Peter founded an Imperial Hospital and Apothecary there. In 1765, it became the property of Count Orlov.

Imperial residence

18th century 

In 1765, Catherine the Great, Empress of the Russian Empire, purchased Gatchina Manor from Prince Boris Kurakin, which featured the village and a small manor. Gatchina was gifted by Catherine to one of her favorites, Count Grigory Grigoryevich Orlov, who reportedly organized the assassination of Tsar Peter III three years earlier, resulting in her becoming empress. A triumphal arch was erected to a design by the architect of Gatchina Palace, Antonio Rinaldi, forming a monumental entrance. Upon Orlov's death in 1783, Gatchina Palace was bought by Catherine from his heirs, and gave it to her son Grand Duke Pavel Petrovich, the future Tsar Paul I. During his ownership, Paul made alterations to the palace, but also began developing the village of Gatchina into a town using experience from his travels around Europe. After ascending to the throne, Paul granted Gatchina the status of Imperial City, an honorary designation for towns that possessed a royal palace. Gatchina Palace was expanded and altered numerous times by its subsequent imperial owners, with the addition of Rococo interiors designed by Rinaldi and Vincenzo Brenna, and executed by Italian stucco workers and Russian craftsmen.

19th century 
In 1854, a railroad connecting Gatchina and Saint Petersburg was opened, and the territory of Gatchina was expanded with several villages in the vicinity being incorporated into the city. The following year Gatchina Palace came under the ownership of Tsar Alexander II, who used it as his second residence. Alexander built a hunting village south of Gatchina into a retreat where he and his guests could enjoy the unspoiled wilderness of northwestern Russia. Following the assassination of Alexander II in 1881, Gatchina Palace was passed to his shaken son, the new Tsar Alexander III, who was advised that he and his family would be safer in Gatchina as opposed to at the Winter Palace in Saint Petersburg. Alexander spent most of his life at Gatchina Palace, which became known as "The Citadel of Autocracy" after the Tsar's reactionary policies. Here he signed decrees, held diplomatic receptions, theatrical performances, masquerades and costumed balls, and other events and entertainment. Alexander III introduced some technological modernizations new to Russia at the Gatchina Palace, such as indoor heaters, electric lights, a telephone network, non-freezing water pipes and a modern sewage system. His son, the future Tsar Nicholas II and the last Russian Tsar, spent his youth in the Gatchina Palace, although he and his family would make Tsarskoye Selo his home. His mother, Dowager Empress Maria Feodorovna, widow of Alexander III, was the patron of the city of Gatchina, the palace and its parks.

20th century
Gatchina was honored as the best-kept city of Russia at the 1900 World's Fair in Paris (Exposition Universelle). The quality of life, education, medical services, and public safety in Gatchina were recognized as the best, and it was recommended as an example for other cities in Russia. In 1910, one of the first airfields in Russia was established in Gatchina, with the city becoming one of the first centers of aviation and engine technology in Russia. The pilot Pyotr Nesterov was trained at the Gatchina airfield and made his first long-distance flight from Gatchina to Kiev. Gatchina Palace remained one of the official imperial residences of Tsar Nicholas II, who was presiding over annual military parades and celebrations of the Imperial Russian Army garrisons, stationed in Gatchina until 1917.

World War I 
During World War I, major medical hospitals in Gatchina were visited by the Tsar Nicholas II and Empress Maria Fyodorovna, the mother of Nicholas II, his wife the Empress Alexandra Fyodorovna, as well as their daughters Grand Duchess Olga, Grand Duchess Tatiana, Grand Duchess Maria, and Grand Duchess Anastasia.

In March 1917, the Russian Empire collapsed upon the abdication of Nicholas II following the February Revolution, leading to a decline in Gatchina's importance as the town and its palace became state property of the Russian Provisional Government, who converted it to a museum.

Russian Civil War 
Shortly afterwards, the outbreak of the Russian Civil War saw Gatchina loyal to the White Movement, and the palace was visited by President Alexander Kerensky on October 27, 1917. During Kerensky's visit, fighting broke out in Gatchina between detachments of the Red Guards and Cossack units of General Pyotr Krasnov. The Reds won the battle, which had avoided the palace, and on November 1, they held a rally outside the palace in the main square, where Pavel Dybenko encouraged the Cossack units stationed in the palace to surrender and not to oppose the Red authorities. Kerensky left Gatchina Palace that night, and it was occupied by Red troops the following day.

Interbellum 
In May 1918, the museum was re-opened by the Reds "for the victorious popular masses of the Russian Revolution" in Gatchina. From 1918 to 1941, the Gatchina Palace and parks were open to public as a national museum. On February 14, 1923, Gatchina was renamed Trotsk by the new Soviet authorities, in honor of Leon Trotsky. After Joseph Stalin became General Secretary of the Communist Party of the Soviet Union, Trotsky was gradually exiled, and the town was renamed Krasnogvardeysk (Red Guard City) on August 2, 1929.

World War 2 

Gatchina was occupied by Nazi Germany from Saturday, September 13, 1941, following the German invasion of the Soviet Union during World War II.
The Germans renamed the town Lindemannstadt, in honor of the Wehrmacht general Georg Lindemann, and looted much of the Gatchina Palace for its collections of art. On January 26, 1944, the Germans abandoned Lindemannstadt during their retreat, setting fire to Gatchina Palace and vandalizing much of the park. The town was quickly retaken by the Red Army, and two days later it was renamed back to its pre-Soviet name, Gatchina.

Rebuilding 
After the war, Gatchina was rebuilt to Soviet standards, and became home to the Petersburg Institute of Nuclear Physics. The extent of the Gatchina Palace's devastation was extraordinary, and initially was considered irreparable damage. Restoration works continued for over 60 years, and some pieces of the art collection were recovered from safe keeping and returned to Gatchina. Today, one section of the Gatchina Palace is partially completed and certain state rooms and the Arsenal Halls are now open to the public. Other areas of the palace, including those of Tsar Alexander III, remain closed and unrestored.

In 1990, shortly before the dissolution of the Soviet Union, Gatchina Palace and surviving buildings in Gatchina's historic center became UNESCO World Heritage Sites, as part of the wider Saint Petersburg and Related Groups of Monuments.  In 1999, Gatchina was awarded in the Most Comfortable City of Russia, a quality of life competition for Russian towns and cities, being ranked first in Category III, the category for cities with a population of under 100,000. In 2010, Gatchina's status as an Historical city of Russia was revoked.

Name
The town has notably been known under various names during its history. As common with larger urban areas under the Soviet Union, Gatchina was renamed to reflect the changed ideals of the government. This first came in honouring Leon Trotsky. However, with the feud between Trotsky and Stalin at a high this name was to become problematic. Thus, the city was renamed again in honour of the Soviet troops. Unlike other regions that underwent this process, Gatchina has a more complex history leading to multiple variations.

Administrative and municipal divisions
Within the framework of administrative divisions, Gatchina serves as the administrative center of Gatchinsky District. As an administrative division, it is incorporated within Gatchinsky District as Gatchinskoye Settlement Municipal Formation. As a municipal division, Gatchinskoye Settlement Municipal Formation is incorporated within Gatchinsky Municipal District as Gatchinskoye Urban Settlement.

Economy

Industry
In Gatchina, there are several enterprises related to timber industry, including a paper mill, and to food industry.

Transportation
Gatchina is an important railway node. One railway, running north to south, connects the Baltiysky railway station in St. Petersburg with Dno and Nevel. Within the town limits, suburban trains in this direction stop at the platform of Tatyanino and the station of Gatchina-Varshavskaya. Another railway, also from the Baltiysky railway station, arrives to Gatchina from the northwest and has two stops, Mariyenburg and Gatchina-Passazhirskaya-Baltiyskaya. Yet another railway runs south of the town center from east to west and connects Mga via Ulyanovka with Volosovo. The railway station on this line in Gatchina is Gatchina-Tovarnaya-Baltiyskaya.

The M20 Highway connecting St. Petersburg and Pskov, crosses Gatchina from north to south. South of Gatchina, it crosses the A120 Highway, which encircles St. Petersburg. A paved road connects Gatchina with Kingisepp via Volosovo. There are also local roads.

Science
Gatchina is the site of the Petersburg Nuclear Physics Institute.

Twin towns – sister cities

Gatchina is twinned with:
 Eskilstuna, Sweden
 Ettlingen, Germany
 Coatbridge, United Kingdom

References

Notes

Sources

Further reading
St. Petersburg: Architecture of the Tsars. Abbeville Press, 1996. 
Knopf Guide: St. Petersburg. New York: Knopf, 1995. 
Glantz, David M. The Battle for Leningrad, 1941–1944. Lawrence: University Press of Kansas, 2002. 
Radzinsky, Edvard. Alexander II: The Last Great Tsar. New York: The Free Press, 2005.

External links

Official website of Gatchina 
Gatchina Business Directory 
Art monuments & History of former residence of the Russian Emperors
Gatchina over the Centuries 
Views of Gatchina Park

 
World Heritage Sites in Russia
Royal residences in Russia
Tsarskoselsky Uyezd
Gatchinsky District